Thomas Hees (1634 - 1693) was a Dutch diplomat, active in the negotiations of the States General with the corsairs of Barbary. He is mostly known through his famous portrait (painted by Michiel van Musscher) but also thanks to the journal which he kept during his first mission in Algiers.

Early life
Hees was born to a wealthy family of Weesp in 1634. At the age of 20, he was enrolled in the faculty of Philosophy of the University of Leiden, only to switch to medicine four years later. He completed his medical studies in Angers and then returned to the Republic in 1660 where he was named doctor(geneesheer) at the "Collegium Medicum" of Amsterdam. In 1664-5 he accompanied Jacob Boreel during his embassy to the court of czar Alexis I in Moscow.

Missions in Barbary
Even though the Dutch had acquired their own Capitulations by the Ottoman Porte in Constantinople as early as 1612, the corsairs of Algiers, Tunis and Tripoli (still nominally under the suzerainty of the Sultan) kept on preying on Dutch shipping passing through the Straits, taking hundreds of sailors as slaves in the process. The Dutch government retaliated with a number of punitive expeditions, the most famous of which were the three missions of Michiel de Ruyter in the Mediterranean.
In 1674, Algiers decided that it could not keep up fighting against all of the European maritime powers and called on the States General to send an envoy in order to negotiate the terms of a potential peace. The man chosen for this mission was Thomas Hees, who was dispatched to Algiers in 1675, bearing the title of “commissaris”. It took four long years of constant bargaining before Hees could acquire a guarantee of a stable peace agreement, the lengthy negotiations of which he described in his diary.
In 1682 Hees was back in Algiers, this time to free the remaining slaves. From then on, he travelled to Tunis and Tripoli in order to conclude peace with these cities as well. Finally, Hees went on a third mission in 1685, this time to reinforce the existing treaties. After the end of his diplomatic career he settled back in Amsterdam. Hees died in 1693 and was buried in the Nieuwe Kerk on September 3 of that year.

Notes and references

Sources
 Hardenberg, Herman, Tussen Zeerovers en Christenslaven. Noordafrikaanse Reisjournalen, (Leiden 1950).
 van Krieken, Gerard, Kapers en Kooplieden: De Betrekkingen tussen Algiers en Nederland 1604-1830, (Amsterdam 1999).
 Weber, Roijen, De Beveiliging van de Zee tegen Europeesche en Barbarijse Zeerovers 1609-1621, (Amsterdam 1936).

1634 births
1693 deaths
17th-century Dutch diplomats
Barbary pirates
People from Weesp
Burials at the Nieuwe Kerk, Amsterdam